Several motor ships have been called MV Seaforth. They include:

, a  cargo ship launched in 1938 and sunk in 1941.
MV Seaforth, a  coaster launched in 1945 as Empire Seaforth, renamed Seaforth in 1947, renamed Halfaya in 1951 and last recorded in 1968.

Ship names